Matryona Ivanovna Balk (née Modesta Mons; fl. 1718), was a Tsardom of Russian courtier. She was a lady-in-waiting and confidant of Catherine I of Russia, Ober-Hofmeisterin of Tsarevna Catherine Ivanovna of Russia and sister of Anna Mons. She was accused in 1718 for having assisted the empress in her love affair with Willem Mons.

See also
Natalia Lopukhina, her daughter

References
Балк, Матрена Ивановна // Русский биографический словарь : в 25 томах. — СПб.—М., 1896—1918.

18th-century deaths
Tsardom of Russia ladies-in-waiting